Banque pour le Commerce et l'Industrie – Mer Rouge (BCIMR) is a bank in Djibouti. It has a market share of around 45%, and is the largest bank in the Horn of Africa. BCIMR is a subsidiary of the French bank BRED Banque populaire, which owns a 51% share in the company. The Government of Djibouti and a Yemeni bank own the remaining 33% and 16% shares, respectively. BCIMR has a branch in Hargeisa, situated in the self-declared Republic of Somaliland, internationally considered to be part of Somalia.

History
In 1943, BNCI, an ancestor of BNP Paribas, took over Crédit Foncier de Madagascar et de la Réunion, which it renamed BNCI Océan Indien in 1954. BNCI Océan Indien opened a branch in Djibouti the same year. In 1977, when Djibouti achieved independence from France, BNP converted the branch into a subsidiary.

In July 2007, BNP Paribas sold BCIMR to the French banking group Banques Populaires.

In February 2009, BCIMR opened a branch in Hargeisa, becoming the first bank there since the dissolution of the Commercial and Savings Bank of Somalia in 1990.

See also

Economy of Djibouti

External links
BCIMR @ DjiboutiPhoneBook
BRED - Banque Populaire

Citations and references
Citations

References
Alwan, Daoud Aboubakern, and Yohanis Mibrathu (2000) Historical Dictionary of Djibouti. (Scarecrow Press). 

Companies of Djibouti
Banks of Djibouti